The 71st Flying Training Wing is a United States Air Force unit assigned to Air Education and Training Command. It is stationed at Vance Air Force Base, Oklahoma where has conducted pilot training for the Air Force and allied nations since 1972. It also is the host unit for Vance.

The wing was briefly activated as the 71st Tactical Reconnaissance Wing in 1948 but was operational for only a few weeks before being discontinued.  During the Cold War, as the 71st Strategic Reconnaissance Wing, it was a part of Strategic Air Command. The wing performed strategic reconnaissance and also tested a technique for launching small F-84K reconnaissance aircraft from GRB-36 bombers to extend the range of photographic reconnaissance and fighter escort. The testing ended in 1956, but the wing continued strategic reconnaissance until inactivated on 1 July 1957.

The wing was activated again in 1962 as the 71 Surveillance Wing. It operated and maintained systems to detect intercontinental ballistic missiles and sea-launched ballistic missile launches until it was inactivated in 1971.  The wing was activated with its current mission a year later.

Mission
The 71st Flying Training Wing conducts Joint Specialized Undergraduate Pilot Training. Its mission is to develop professional United States and allied nation pilots who are combat ready. It is responsible for training Air Force and allied student pilots for worldwide deployment and Aerospace Expeditionary Force support.

Joint Specialized Undergraduate Pilot Training is conducted in three phases. Phase I is preflight, Phase II is Primary and is conducted with the Beechcraft T-6 Texan II. Phase III may be either fighter-bomber track, conducted with the Northrop T-38 Talon or tanker-airlift track, conducted with the Raytheon T-1 Jayhawk.

Units
 71st Operations Group
 3d Flying Training Squadron "Jayhawks" T-1 Jayhawk
 5th Flying Training Squadron "Spittin' Kittens" Beechcraft T-6 Texan II, T-1 Jayhawk, Northrop T-38 Talon
 The mission of the 5th is to train and provide a reserve of experienced instructor pilots to augment the Air Education and Training Command’s instructor cadre in the event of wartime mobilization.
 8th Flying Training Squadron "8 Ballers" Beechcraft T-6 Texan II
 25th Flying Training Squadron "Shooters" Northrop T-38 Talon
 33d Flying Training Squadron "Dragons" Beechcraft T-6 Texan II
 71st Operations Support Squadron "Ghostriders"
 71st Student Squadron "Stucans"
 71st Mission Support Group
 71st Medical Group
 71st Comptroller Squadron

History

Initial activation
The wing was first activated at Kadena Air Base, Okinawa in August 1948 in the wing base reorganization of the United States Air Force, but was a viable entity for only a few days.  Its tactical group was detached to the 32d Composite Wing and the wing had only one single reconnaissance squadron to perform photographic reconnaissance attached for its first week of existence. When the squadron was reassigned, the wing became non-operational and its manning was withdrawn.  The wing was inactivated in late October.

Strategic Reconnaissance

The wing was reactivated at Larson Air Force Base, Washington as the 71st Strategic Reconnaissance Wing.  At Larson, it performed strategic reconnaissance and tested the FICON project to extend the range of photographic reconnaissance and fighter escort aircraft beginning in January 1955.  FICON involved using an RF-84K, a version of the Republic RF-84F Thunderflash with a retractable "duck-bill" to enable it to be carried by a modified Convair B-36 Peacemaker to increase its range.  The RF-84K was equipped with anhedral (downward-pointing) horizontal stabilizers to clear the bomb bay when in the stowed position.

The tests revealed that the "parasite" concept was achievable but not practical. Hook-ups with the GRB-36 were nearly impossible to achieve in turbulence and would likely be unworkable under combat conditions. In addition, ground clearance with the fighter mounted was around 6 inches when the RF-84K was equipped with external fuel tanks. The problem of drag was even worse. The stowed fighter reduced the range of the GRB-36 by five to ten percent.

In 1956 the entire FICON project was canceled, but the wing continued strategic reconnaissance until it was inactivated in 1957.

Missile warning
The wing was activated again at Ent Air Force Base, Colorado as the 71st Surveillance Wing. It operated and maintained the Ballistic Missile Early Warning System, including sites in Alaska, Greenland, and England. It also operated the sea-launched ballistic missile detection and warning system and supported the USAF Spacetrack system, and monitored the over-the-horizon radar system, 1969–1971.

Flying training

The wing was redesignated the 71st Flying Training Wing and replaced the 3575 Pilot Training Wing at Vance Air Force Base, Oklahoma in November 1972, assuming control of the undergraduate pilot training for USAF, Air National Guard, Air Force Reserve, and allied countries there. In addition, it supported the Accelerated Co-Pilot Enrichment (ACE) program at numerous operating locations between 1978 and 1991. The wing provided initial flight training, and follow-on training for fighter, bomber and airlift/tanker aircraft crews for USAF, US Navy, Marine Corps and allied forces.

Lineage
 Established as the 71st Tactical Reconnaissance Wing on 10 August 1948
 Activated on 18 August 1948
 Inactivated on 25 October 1948
 Redesignated 71st Strategic Reconnaissance Wing, Fighter on 4 November 1954
 Activated on 24 January 1955
 Inactivated on 1 July 1957
 Redesignated 71st Surveillance Wing (Ballistic Missile Early Warning System) and activated on 6 December 1961 (not organized)
 Organized on 1 January 1962
 Redesignated 71st Missile Warning Wing on 1 January 1967
 Inactivated on 30 April 1971
 Redesignated 71st Flying Training Wing on 14 April 1972
 Activated on 1 November 1972

Assignments
 1st Air Division, 18 August – 25 October 1948 (attached to 32d Composite Wing after 24 August 1948)
 Fifteenth Air Force, 24 January 1955 – 1 July 1957
 Air Defense Command, 6 December 1961 (not organized)
 9th Aerospace Defense Division, 1 January 1962
 Fourteenth Aerospace Force, 1 July 1968 – 30 April 1971
 Air Training Command (later Air Education and Training Command), 1 November 1972
 Nineteenth Air Force, 1 July 1993
 Air Education and Training Command, 12 July 2012
 Nineteenth Air Force, 1 October 2014 – present

Components
 Groups
 71st Tactical Reconnaissance Group (later 71 Operations Group): 18 August – 25 October 1948 (attached to 32d Composite Wing); 15 December 1991 – present

 Squadrons
 5th Flying Training Squadron: 16 February 1990 – 15 December 1991
 7th Flying Training Squadron: 19 January 1990 – 15 December 1991
 8th Flying Training Squadron: 1 November 1972 – 15 December 1991
 12th Missile Warning Squadron, 1 January 1967 – 30 April 1971
 Thule Air Base, Greenland
 13th Missile Warning Squadron, 1 January 1967 – 30 April 1971
 Clear Air Force Station, Alaska
 23d Tactical Reconnaissance Squadron: attached 18–24 August 1948
 25th Strategic Reconnaissance Squadron (later 25 Flying Training Squadron): 24 January 1955 – 1 July 1957; 1 November 1972 – 15 December 1991
 26th Flying Training Squadron: 19 January 1990 – 15 December 1991
 82d Strategic Reconnaissance Squadron: 24 January 1955 – 1 July 1957
 91st Strategic Reconnaissance Squadron: 24 January 1955 – 1 July 1957

Stations
 Kadena Air Base, Okinawa, 18 August – 25 October 1948
 Larson Air Force Base, Washington, 24 January 1955 – 1 July 1957
 Ent Air Force Base, Colorado, 1 January 1962
 McGuire Air Force Base, New Jersey, 21 July 1969 – 30 April 1971
 Vance Air Force Base, Oklahoma, 1 November 1972 – present

Aircraft

 Boeing RB-17 Flying Fortress, 1948
 Boeing RB-29 Superfortress, 1948
 Republic RF-84F Thunderflash, 1955–1957
 Republic RF-84K (GRF-84) Thunderflash, 1955–1956
 Cessna T-41 Mescalero, 1972–1973
 Cessna T-37 Tweet, 1972–2006
 Northrop T-38 Talon, 1972–present
 Raytheon T-1 Jayhawk, 1994–present
 Beechcraft T-6 Texan II, 2004–present

See also
 List of USAF Reconnaissance wings assigned to Strategic Air Command
 List of B-29 Superfortress operators

References

Notes

Citations

Bibliography

 
 
 

0071
Military units and formations in Oklahoma